WFU can refer to 
Wake Forest University, a private university in North Carolina
Water filtration unit, used for water purification
Westlife Fans United, a fan club for the vocal group Westlife
Wildland Fire Use, a wildland fire management term
Withdrawn from use, a military acronym, particularly in the United Kingdom
Women's Food and Farming Union, an organization in the United Kingdom
 Woodfree uncoated paper
 WuFeng University in Chiayi County, Taiwan